Nieves Yankovic (1916–1985) was a Chilean actress and documentary maker. "The only woman film director in Chile during the fifties and sixties", her documentary Andacollo (1958) influenced socially committed documentary in Chile. She has been called "an iconic figure among women filmmakers".

Life
Born in Antofagasta, Nieves Yankovic lived in Europe from 1928 to 1942. She was one of the founders of the University of Chile Experimental Theatre. A film actress under the name Nieves Yanko, she made her debut in Luis Moglia Barth's Romance de medio sieglo (Romance of half a century, 1944). She also acted in Carlos Borcosque's Amarga verdad (1945), Roberto de Ribón's El Padre Pitillo (1946), Carlos Hugo Christensen's La dama de la muerte (1946), Fred Matter's El paso maldito (1949), Pierre Chenal's El ídolo (1952) and Pierre Chenal's Confesiones al amanecer (1954).

Yankovic worked as assistant director under Carlos Hugo Christensen and Pierre Chenal. In 1946 she married Jorge di Lauro, a sound engineer at Chile Films. From 1958 until 1972 the pair directed documentaries together.

After the 1973 Chilean coup d'état, Yankovic and her husband worked as teachers.

Filmography
All co-directed with Jorge di Lauro:
 Andacollo, 1958
 Los aristas chilenos plasticos, 1959–60
 Isla de Pascua, 1961
 Verano en invierno, 1962
 San Pedro de Atacama, 1963-4
 Cuando el pueblo avanza, 1966
 Operacio Sitio, 1970
 Obreros campesinos, 1972)

References

1916 births
1985 deaths
20th-century Chilean actresses
Chilean film directors
Chilean women film directors
Chilean documentary filmmakers
Women documentary filmmakers